Yamaga may refer to:

 Hiroyuki Yamaga (born 1962), Japanese anime director and producer
 Yamaga Sokō (1622–1685), Japanese philosopher and strategist
 Yamaga, Kumamoto
 Yamaga, Ōita
 Yamaga Formation
 Yamaga Station

Japanese-language surnames